The Martin 4-0-4 was an American pressurized passenger airliner built by the Glenn L. Martin Company. In addition to airline use initially in the United States, it was used by the United States Coast Guard and United States Navy as the RM-1G (later as the VC-3A).

Design and development
When production of the earlier Martin 2-0-2 was stopped due to problems with wing structural failure the company decided to re-wing an improved version (which had already flown as the Martin 3-0-3). The new aircraft was the Martin 4-0-4. It had structural changes to the wings, pressurization and was lengthened slightly to take 40 passengers. Like the earlier 2-0-2, the 4-0-4 was a cantilever monoplane with a standard tail unit (cantilever tailplane and single vertical stabilizer). It had an airstair in the lower tail section for passenger boarding and disembarkation, retractable tricycle landing gear and was powered by two Pratt & Whitney R-2800-CB16 radial piston engines.

Operational history

First deliveries in 1951 were made to Eastern Air Lines (EAL), which had ordered 60, and Trans World Airlines (TWA), which had ordered 40. The only other new aircraft from the production line were delivered to the United States Coast Guard which had ordered two as executive transports with the designation RM-1G later changed to RM-1 and then in 1962 to VC-3A. In 1969 they were transferred to the United States Navy and were withdrawn from use by 1970. A total of 103 aircraft were built at the Glenn L. Martin factory in Baltimore.

TWA operated its 40 4-0-4s under the name "Skyliner" on scheduled services between 1 September 1950 and the last flight on 29 April 1961. EAL operated its 4-0-4s in the eastern USA using the class name "Silver Falcon". The first EAL schedule was flown on 5 January 1952 and retirement came in late 1962.
 
Later in their airline career, as they became displaced from the EAL and TWA fleets by turbine-powered aircraft, the 4-0-4s became popular with "second level" operators, known as "local service air carriers" in the U.S. as described and regulated by the federal Civil Aeronautics Board (CAB), with these airlines needing to replace their Douglas DC-3s. One of the last 'major' US airlines with a large fleet of piston-engined airliners was Southern Airways which operated 25 model 4-0-4s on a network of scheduled services from Atlanta in October 1961, all ex-Eastern Airlines aircraft. Southern Airways' last 4-0-4 service was flown on 30 April 1978 with the air carrier then replacing them with smaller Fairchild Swearingen Metroliner "Metro II" turboprops.  This was the last piston-engine airliner flight of all the mainstream USA carriers. Martin 4-0-4s were also flown by Pacific Air Lines (which subsequently merged with Bonanza Air Lines and West Coast Airlines to form Air West, which was then renamed Hughes Airwest), Piedmont Airlines (which operated former TWA 4-0-4 airliners), Ozark Air Lines and Mohawk Airlines during the 1960s.  Most of these planes were replaced in 1968 with Fairchild F-27 and/or Fairchild-Hiller FH-227B turboprop aircraft.

Following their retirement by the aforementioned local service air carriers, a number of 4-0-4s were then operated by several U.S. based commuter and regional airlines including Air South, Atlantic Southeast Airlines (ASA), Florida Airlines, Marco Island Airways, Provincetown-Boston Airlines (PBA) and Southeast Airlines.  Martin 4-0-4s were also used in Air Florida Commuter feeder service when Air Florida was operating domestic and international scheduled passenger jet service during the 1970s and 1980s.

In February 2008 the last airworthy 4-0-4, an ex TWA aircraft, was ferried to the Planes of Fame Museum in Valle, Arizona.

Operators
♠ original operators

Civil

 Aero Proveedora Proa Ltda

 Dominair
 Santiago Freighters

 Air South
 Atlantic Southeast Airlines (1972–1979)
 Eastern Airlines (1951–1962) ♠
 Florida Airlines (1977–1981)
 Marco Island Airways (1973–1981)
 Mohawk Airlines (1961–1965)
 Ozark Air Lines (1964–1967)
 Pacific Air Lines (1959–1968)
 Piedmont Airlines (1961–1972)
 Provincetown-Boston Airlines (PBA) (1975–1984)
 Southeast Airlines (1971–1976)
 Southern Airways (1961–1978)
 Trans World Airlines (TWA) (1950–1961) ♠

 Rentavion

Military

 United States Coast Guard ♠
 United States Navy

Notable accidents and incidents
 19 February 1955: TWA Flight 260 crashed into the Sandia Mountains; the three crew and 13 passengers died.
 1 April 1956: TWA Flight 400 crashed on takeoff from Greater Pittsburgh International Airport; 22 of the 36 people aboard the aircraft died.
 2 July 1963: Mohawk Airlines Flight 121 crashed during takeoff from Rochester-Monroe airport, seven people died and 36 were injured.
 30 May 1970:  Lehigh Acres Development Inc. Flight 701 crashed near Atlanta, Georgia, one passenger and five people in a car died. Thirty other passengers were injured after just departing moments before from the Peachtree-DeKalb Airport.
 2 October 1970: In the Wichita State University Crash, a charter flight operated by Golden Eagle Aviation crashed near Silver Plume, Colorado; 31 of the 40 people on board died.

Surviving aircraft
 14119 – Fuselage in storage at Fantasy of Flight in Polk City, Florida. It was previously registered as N40415 and is in former Provincetown–Boston Airlines livery.
 14135 – Airworthy at the Planes of Fame Air Museum in Valle, Arizona. It is registered as N636X and is in a Pacific Air Lines livery.
 14141 – On static display at the Mid-Atlantic Air Museum in Reading, Pennsylvania. It was previously registered as N450A and is painted in an Eastern Air Lines livery.
 14142 – On static display at the National Airline History Museum in Kansas City, Missouri. It was previously registered as N145S.
 14143 – Cockpit on static display at the National Museum of Commercial Aviation in Forest Park, Georgia. It was previously registered as N9234C.
 14153 – On static display at the Pima Air & Space Museum in Tucson, Arizona. It was previously registered as N462M.
 14158 – Stored at Billings Logan International Airport in Billings, Montana. It was previously registered as N974M and is used for fire evacuation training.
 14227 – Owned by Harold Sheppard Jr. of Riverton, Wyoming. It is registered as N461M.
 14233 – On static display at the Glenn L. Martin Aviation Museum in Middle River, Maryland. It was previously registered as N259S, but is painted as N40400, the first 4-0-4 prototype.
 14246 – Stored at the Flying Tigers Airport near Paris, Texas. It was previously registered as N255S.

Specifications

See also

References

Notes

Bibliography

 Andrade, John. U.S. Military Aircraft Designations and Serials since 1909. Leicester, UK: Midland Counties Publications, 1979, pp. 95, 217. .
  Breslau, Alan Jeffry The Time Of My Death: Story of Miraculous Survival (E. P. Dutton, New York 1977) The July 2, 1963 crash of Mowhawk Airlines in Rochester, New York.
 Bridgman, Leonard. Jane's All The World's Aircraft 1953–54. London: Sampson Low, Marston & Co. Ltd, 1953.
 Gunston, Bill. The Illustrated Encyclopedia of Propeller Airliners. Leicester, UK: Windward Imprint, 1980. .
 The Illustrated Encyclopedia of Aircraft (Part Work 1982-1985). London: Orbis Publishing, 1985.
 Killion, Gary L. The Martinliners. Sandpoint ID: Airways International Inc., 1997. .
 Sievers, Harry. North American Airline Fleets. Tunbridge Wells, Kent, UK: Air-Britain (Historians) Ltd., 1969. .
 Smith, M.J. Jr. Passenger Airliners of the United States, 1926–1991. Missoula, Montana: Pictorial Histories Publishing Company, 1986. .

External links 

 Martin Airliners - Maryland Aviation Museum
 Martin 202/404 Census - oldprops.ukhome.net (photos and history also on site)
 Many detailed close-up photographs of a restored Martin 4-0-4 
 Aviation Safety Network
 Federal Aviation Authority Type Certificate for the Martin 404

1950s United States airliners
4-0-4
Low-wing aircraft
Aircraft first flown in 1950
Twin piston-engined tractor aircraft